Ogdensburg Free Academy is a public high school in Ogdensburg, New York. It consists of around 750 or more students in the 7th through 12th grade. The famous Golden Dome is located on State Street and attracts residents from across the North Country. Every year, the Ogdensburg Boys & Girls Clubs of America hosts an 'Expo' where local businesses can get the most advertisement. There are also performances (such as the local dance studio or choir) in the Golden Dome.

History 
Ogdensburg Free Academy was founded in 1868.

In March 2020, Ogdensburg Free Academy, along with other schools in the area, closed due to the COVID-19 pandemic. It remained closed until the end of the school year, with classes being held online.

Academics 
Ogdensburg Free Academy is ranked 425th in New York State, and 5,125th in the nation. The AP participation rate is 23%, minority enrollment is 2%, and 54% of enrolled students are economically disadvantaged. It performs slightly below the state median.

Athletics 
Ogdensburg Free Academy's sports teams are known as the Blue Devils. Despite consistently winning NYSPHSAA Section X championships across many sports, they have never won the state championships.

The Blue Devils are notorious in the region for their fast speed in basketball.

OFA is home to the Van Dusen track meet, one of the oldest sporting events in New York history.

Ogdensburg Free Academy offers the following sports:

Fall sports 

 Cheerleading (Varsity)
 Boys’ Cross Country (Varsity, Modified)
 Girls’ Cross Country (Varsity, Modified)
 Football (Varsity, JV, Modified)
 Boys’ Soccer (Varsity, JV, Modified)
 Girls’ Soccer (Varsity, JV, Modified)
 Girls’ Swimming (Varsity, Modified)
 Volleyball (Varsity, JV, Modified)

Winter sports 

 Boys’ Basketball (Varsity, JV, Modified 8th, Modified 7th)
 Girls’ Basketball (Varsity, JV, Modified 8th, Modified 7th)
 Cheerleading (Varsity)
 Boys’ Ice Hockey (Varsity)
 Girls’ Ice Hockey (Varsity, merger with Canton)
 Boys’ Indoor Track and Field (Varsity, Modified)
 Girls’ Indoor Track and Field (Varsity, Modified)
 Wrestling (Varsity, JV, Modified)

Spring sports 

 Baseball (Varsity, JV, Modified)
 Softball (Varsity, JV, Modified)
 Boys’ Lacrosse (Varsity, Modified)
 Girls’ Lacrosse (Varsity, Modified)
 Boys’ Outdoor Track and Field (Varsity, Modified)
 Girls’ Outdoor Track and Field (Varsity, Modified)
 Golf (Varsity)

Intramurals 

 Weight Training (Grades 7-12)

Performances and Fine Arts 
Ogdensburg Free Academy offers many opportunities to students interested in the arts.

Art 
The art department offers a wide variety of classes such as Studio Art, which covers a wide range of different media, as well as more specialized classes such as sculpting, ceramics, painting, and digital art to grades 9 through 12. Students in 7th grade must also take one semester of an art class.

Every year in the fall and spring, the school hosts an art show showcasing entries from grades K-12 throughout the school district in the James F. Montpelier art gallery.

Music 
The music department offers both band and chorus for grades 9-12, as well as a separate middle school band and chorus for grades 7–8. There is also a separate Jazz Band for 7-12.

Theater 
The OFA Drama Club puts an annual musical on between November and December. Participation is not mandatory. Grades 8-12 are allowed to audition for speaking roles, or alternatively participate in the ensemble alongside Grade 7. In addition, Grades 7-12 are allowed to join the crew to help with the lights, audio, and any props that need to be moved on and off stage. Only Grade 12 students taking Theater Tech as an elective are allowed to man the ropes.

Alumni 

 Pete Gogolak, the first soccer-style placekicker in American professional football, and his younger brother Charlie, who also became a professional football placekicker, both attended Ogdensburg Free Academy and played their first football games there.

References

Public high schools in New York (state)
Schools in St. Lawrence County, New York
Public middle schools in New York (state)